is a city located in Saitama Prefecture, Japan. , the city had an estimated population of 52,431 in 21,997 households and a population density of 2100 persons per km².

Geography
Shiraoka is located slightly south of the center of the Kanto Plain in the flatlands eastern Saitama Prefecture and has an almost flat terrain. The highest point in the city is 16 meters above sea level. The Motoara River runs along the city border with Hasuda. Shiraoka is approximately 40 kilometers from downtown Tokyo.,

Surrounding municipalities
 Saitama Prefecture
 Kasukabe
 Saitama
 Kuki
 Hasuda
 Miyoshi

Climate
Shiraoka has a humid subtropical climate (Köppen Cfa) characterized by warm summers and cool winters with light to no snowfall.  The average annual temperature in Shiraoka is 14.7 °C. The average annual rainfall is 1352 mm with September as the wettest month. The temperatures are highest on average in August, at around 26.7 °C, and lowest in January, at around 3.77 °C.

Demographics
Per Japanese census data, the population of Shiraoka has increased from the 1980s.

History
The villages of Shinozu and Oyama were created within Minamisaitama District, Saitama with the establishment of the modern municipalities system on April 1, 1889. On September 1, 1965 Shinozu and the neighboring village of Hikachi, together with a part of Oyama merged to form the town of Shiraoka. Shiraoka was elevated to city status on October 1, 2012.

Government
Shiraoka has a mayor-council form of government with a directly elected mayor and a unicameral city council of 18 members. Shiraoka, together with the town of Miyashiro, contributes one member to the Saitama Prefectural Assembly. In terms of national politics, the city is part of Saitama 13th district of the lower house of the Diet of Japan.

Economy
Shiraoka remains primarily an agricultural community; however due to its location, it is increasingly becoming a bedroom community for neighboring Saitama City and the Tokyo metropolis.

Education
Shiraoka has six public elementary schools and four public middle schools operated by the city government, and one public high school operated by the Saitama Prefectural Board of Education.

Transportation

Railway
 JR East – Utsunomiya Line
 -

Highway

Local attractions
Shiraoka Hachiman-gu

Noted people from Shiraoka
Hiroshi Narahara, professional baseball player
Yusuke Suzuki, professional soccer player

References

External links

Official Website 

Cities in Saitama Prefecture
Shiraoka, Saitama